Acanthocyte is a form of red blood cell that has a spiked cell membrane, due to abnormal thorny projections.

Acanthocyte may also refer to:

 Acanthocyte (mycology), stellate cells found on the hyphae of fungi of the genus Stropharia

See also
 Neuroacanthocytosis, neurological conditions in which the blood contains acanthocytes
Acanthosis, thickening of the skin not connected to acanthocytes
 Acanthoctenus, a genus of spiders